The Aurealis Awards are presented annually by the Australia-based Chimaera Publications and Conflux Inc to published works in order to "recognise the achievements of Australian science fiction, fantasy, horror writers". To qualify, a work must have been first published by an Australian citizen or permanent resident between 1 January and 31 December of the current year; the presentation ceremony is held the following year. It has grown from a small function of around 20 people to a two-day event attended by over 200 people.

Since their creation in 1995, awards have been given in various categories of speculative fiction. Categories currently include science fiction, fantasy, horror, speculative young adult fiction—with separate awards for novels and short fiction—collections, anthologies, illustrative works or graphic novels, children's books, and an award for excellence in speculative fiction. The awards have attracted the attention of publishers by setting down a benchmark in science fiction and fantasy. The continued sponsorship by publishers such as HarperCollins and Orbit has identified the award as an honour to be taken seriously.

The results are decided by a panel of judges from a list of submitted nominees; the long-list of nominees is reduced to a short-list of finalists. Ties can occur if the panel decides both entries show equal merit, however they are encouraged to choose a single winner. The judges are selected from a public application process by the Award's management team.

This article lists all the short-list nominees and winners in the best children's fiction (told primarily through pictures) category, as well as works that have received honourable mentions or have been highly commended. The best children's fiction (told primarily through pictures) award was created in 2001, as best children's short fiction, along with an award for children's long fiction. In 2008 the award was renamed "best children's illustrated work/picture book" and in 2010 was renamed again to "best children's fiction (told primarily through pictures)". Since 2001, hounarable mentions and high commendations have been awarded intermittently. Of the 20 winners, Kim Gamble is the only person to have won the award multiple times, with two wins. Anna Fienberg holds the record for most nominations with six, and Barbara Fienberg has the most nominations without winning, having been a losing finalist four times.

This award has been merged with that for best children's fiction (told primarily through words) into an award for best children's book.

Aurealis Award for Best Children's Short Fiction

Winners and Nominees
In the following table, the years correspond to the year of the book's eligibility; the ceremonies are always held the following year. Each year links to the corresponding "year in literature" article. Entries with a blue background have won the award; those with a white background are the nominees on the short-list.

 Winners and joint winners
 Nominees on the shortlist

Honourable mentions and highly commended short stories
In the following table, the years correspond to the year of the short story's eligibility; the ceremonies are always held the following year. Each year links to the corresponding "year in literature" article. Entries with a grey background have been noted as highly commended; those with a white background have received honourable mentions.

 Highly commended
 Honourable mentions

 I Publisher names in parentheses indicate the imprint under which the book was published.

Aurealis Award for Best Children's Illustrated Work/Picture Book

2008–2009
In the following table, the years correspond to the year of the book's eligibility; the ceremonies are always held the following year. Each year links to the corresponding "year in literature" article. Entries with a blue background have won the award; those with a white background are the nominees on the short-list.

 Winners and joint winners
 Nominees on the shortlist

 I Publisher names in parentheses indicate the imprint under which the book was published.

Aurealis Award for Best Children's Fiction (told primarily through pictures)

2010 onwards
In the following table, the years correspond to the year of the book's eligibility; the ceremonies are always held the following year. Each year links to the corresponding "year in literature" article. Entries with a blue background have won the award; those with a white background are the nominees on the short-list.

 Winners and joint winners
 Nominees on the shortlist

References

External links

Aurealis Awards

Australian children's literary awards
Aurealis Awards